In mathematics, the Hilbert–Mumford criterion, introduced by David Hilbert  and David Mumford,  characterizes the semistable and stable points of a group action on a vector space in terms of eigenvalues of 1-parameter subgroups .

Definition of stability

Let G be a reductive group acting linearly on a vector space V, a non-zero point of V is called
semi-stable if 0 is not contained in the closure of its orbit, and unstable otherwise;
stable if its orbit is closed, and its stabilizer is finite. A stable point is a fortiori semi-stable. A semi-stable but not stable point is called strictly semi-stable.

When G is the multiplicative group , e.g. C* in the complex setting, the action amounts to a finite dimensional representation . The integer i is called the weight. Then for each point x, we look at the set of weights in which it has a non-zero component.
If all the weights are strictly positive, then , so 0 is in the closure of the orbit of x, i.e. x is unstable;
If all the weights are non-negative, with 0 being a weight, then either 0 is the only weight, in which case x is stabilized by C*; or there are some positive weights beside 0, then the limit  is equal to the weight-0 component of x, which is not in the orbit of x. So the two cases correspond exactly to the respective failure of the two conditions in the definition of a stable point, i.e. we have shown that x is strictly semi-stable.

Statement
The Hilbert–Mumford criterion essentially says that the multiplicative group case is the typical situation. Precisely, for a general reductive group G acting linearly on a vector space V, the stability of a point x can be characterized via the study of 1-parameter subgroups of G, which are non-trivial morphisms .
A point x is unstable if and only if there is a 1-parameter subgroup of G for which x admits only positive weights or only negative weights; equivalently, x is semi-stable if and only if there is no such 1-parameter subgroup, i.e. for every 1-parameter subgroup there are both non-positive and non-negative weights;
A point x is strictly semi-stable if and only if there is a 1-parameter subgroup of G for which x admits 0 as a weight, with all the weights being non-negative (or non-positive);
A point x is stable if and only if there is no 1-parameter subgroup of G for which x admits only non-negative weights or only non-positive weights, i.e. for every 1-parameter subgroup there are both positive and negative weights.

Examples and applications

Action of C* on the plane
Clearly the weight in the x-direction is 1 and the weight in the y-direction is -1. Thus by the Hilbert–Mumford criterion, a non-zero point on the x-axis admits 1 as its only weight, and a non-zero point on the y-axis admits -1 as its only weight, so they are both unstable; a general point in the plane admits both 1 and -1 as weights, so it is stable.

Points in P1
Many examples arise in moduli problems. For example, consider a set of n points on the rational curve P1 (more precisely, a length-n subscheme of P1). The automorphism group of P1, PSL(2,C), acts on such sets (subschemes), and the Hilbert–Mumford criterion allows us to determine the stability under this action.

We can linearize the problem by identifying a set of n points with a degree-n homogeneous polynomial in two variables. We consider therefore the action of SL(2,C) on the vector space  of such homogeneous polynomials. Given a 1-parameter subgroup , we can choose coordinates x and y so that the action on P1 is given as

For a homogeneous polynomial of form , the term  has weight k(2i-n). So the polynomial admits both positive and negative (resp. non-positive and non-negative) weights if and only if there are terms with i>n/2 and i<n/2 (resp. i≥n/2 and i≤n/2). In particular the multiplicity of x or y should be <n/2 (reps. ≤n/2). If we repeat over all the 1-parameter subgroups, we may obtain the same condition of multiplicity for all points in P1. By the Hilbert–Mumford criterion, the polynomial (and thus the set of n points) is stable (resp. semi-stable) if and only if its multiplicity at any point is <n/2 (resp. ≤n/2).

Plane cubics
A similar analysis using homogeneous polynomial can be carried out to determine the stability of plane cubics. The Hilbert–Mumford criterion shows that a plane cubic is stable if and only if it is smooth; it is semi-stable if and only if it admits at worst ordinary double points as singularities; a cubic with worse singularities (e.g. a cusp) is unstable.

See also
Geometric invariant theory
GIT quotient

References

Invariant theory